Launched in 1993, the Nebraska Central Railroad  is a shortline railroad that operates about  of track solely in Nebraska.  It runs on former Union Pacific Railroad and BNSF Railway track in central Nebraska.  It is a subsidiary of the Rio Grande Pacific Corporation.

Subdivisions

Albion subdivision, a  stub that starts at Oconee and runs west to Genoa, then turns northwest towards Albion.  This subdivision's business includes unit grain trains to Cargill and unit ethanol trains to Valero in Albion.  Various small agriculture operations also receive NCRC service.

Cedar Rapids Subdivision, a  stub that starts at Genoa and runs west and then northwest towards Spalding.  This subdivision effectively ends at Belgrade; the remaining  is out of service due to marginal traffic. Preferred Sands is a major NCRC customer located west of Genoa.

Norfolk Subdivision is a  stub that starts at the Union Pacific's yard in Columbus, Nebraska and runs west and then north towards Norfolk.  Norfolk has a small yard that was once part of Chicago & Northwestern Railroad's Cowboy Line. Train M-CBNC (Council Bluffs-Nebraska Central) runs across this subdivision daily except Sundays with scrap metal for Nucor Corporation, ethanol for Louis Dreyfus and other businesses in Norfolk.  Agrex in Enola, between Norfolk and Madison, receives unit grain trains. Tyson Foods in Madison also receives NCRC service.

Ord Subdivision is a  stub that starts at Union Pacific's yard in Grand Island and runs north and northwest to Ord. Green Plains Renewable and Cargill have large facilities near Ord.

Palmer Subdivision is a  stub that starts at Central City off Union Pacific's Columbus Subdivision and runs west to Palmer. This was once a BNSF branch that ran from Aurora towards Burwell and Ericson.  Service over this branch was discontinued by NCRC in March 2012.

Stromsburg Subdivision is a  branch line that starts at Central City and runs east to Brainard.  This branch was once referred to as the "High Line" by many Union Pacific crews that operated across the branch. The line connected to the Union Pacific's Lincoln Subdivision in Valparaiso prior to the NCRC takeover in 1993. BNSF Railway interchanges with NCRC at David City. Grain trains are the chief commodity moved over the Stromsburg Sub.

NCRC Operations

Nebraska Central operates out of 3 locations. The headquarters are in Norfolk. The MOW, Signal department and Train Service employees are located in Columbus. The locomotive shop is housed in a former Union Pacific freight house in Grand Island; a small Grand Island Extra Board also operates out of Grand Island.

Locomotives

Union Pacific Locomotives are seen on a regular basis across the Nebraska Central , as they are used for Unit Train movements and the Norfolk Local per run through agreement.

External links

Nebraska Central Railroad Company

Nebraska railroads
Spin-offs of the Union Pacific Railroad